Karin Mayer Rubinstein (born April 23, 1971) is the CEO and president of Israel Advanced Technology Industries (IATI), the Israeli umbrella organization for the high-tech and life sciences industries.

Personal life
Karin Mayer Rubinstein was born in Tel Aviv. Her father is Shai Mayer, who ran the Shalom Mayer Tower, and his father, Mordechai Mayer, Karin's grandfather, was one of the founders of the tower and one of Tel Aviv's founders.

Karin attended Alliance High School in Tel Aviv.

In 1992 she received her B.A. in economics with honors from Tel Aviv University. In 1996 she completed her first degree (LLB) in law and an MBA (and finance) from Tel Aviv University.

Married to Golan Rubinstein and mother of three children. She lives in Tel Aviv.

Career 
In 1996–1997 she was an intern of the late Rut Oren in the law firm of Hurvitz & Co.

In 1997 she joined Efrati Galili Law Firm, and later became a senior partner and manager of the firm's business development division.

In 2008-2010 she founded & headed the business development department at the Herzog, Fox, Neeman & Co. law firm.

Since 2011 she serves as CEO and president of the Israeli Association for Advanced Industries (IATI), the Israeli umbrella organization for the hi-tech and life sciences industries, which includes more than 700 members from all sectors in Israel: multinational development centers, venture capital funds, Incubators, technological accelerators, private investors, academic and medical commercialization companies, and service providers.

Mayer Rubinstein was chosen twice in a row for one of the "Top 100 Young Business Leaders" of Forbes magazine Israel, and as one of the 40 leading business leaders of The Marker.

Karin represents Israel and its innovation industry on a regular basis as key speaker in a multitude of events held worldwide, including some held at the UN. In addition, she serves as a judge in many Israeli and global tech competitions.

Roles and positions 

 CEO and president of Israel Advanced Technology Industries (IATI)
 Member of the board of governors of Tel Aviv University
 Member of the managing board of The Tel Aviv Foundation.
 Chairwoman of the committee for International R&D relations for the National Council for Research and Development.
 Member of the patent oversight committee in the Department of Justice.
 Member of the high tech committee in charge of advancing members of the Arab society.
 Member of advisory committees of various entrepreneurship and technology organizations and lectures at conferences in Israel and abroad.

Links 

 Karin's Article in the "Israeli High Tech Book" by The Marker - Towards 2021, marking the targets to push the economy.
 The industry review by the Innovation Authority & IATI. Globes, July 21, 2020.
 Freezing the Innovation Authority budget - a critical hit for the entire industry, Calcalist, February 23, 2020.
 Karin Mayer Rubinstein, Setting up high tech funds requires guidance & training. The Marker, July 13, 2017
 Karin Mayer Rubinstein, More than positioning: Israel's tech challenges, The Jerusalem Post, September 5, 2016.
 Idan Rabi, "less than 5% of investments in High Tech are made by Israelis", Globes, July 15, 2015
 Karin Mayer Rubinstein, This is how Israel can shock Bloomberg's Innovation Index, The Marker, February 12, 2013.
 Sagit Fastman, Lesson number 10: Don't be afraid to fail, Saloona, December 31, 2013.

References 

1971 births
Living people
Israeli women lawyers
Israeli women chief executive officers
Tel Aviv University alumni